D-Man-alpha-(1->3)-D-Glc-beta-(1->4)-D-Glc-alpha-1-diphosphoundecaprenol 2-beta-glucuronyltransferase (GumK) is an enzyme with systematic name UDP-glucuronate:D-Man-alpha-(1->3)-D-Glc-beta-(1->4)-D-Glc-alpha-1-diphospho-ditrans,octacis-undecaprenol beta-1,2-glucuronyltransferase. This enzyme catalyses the following chemical reaction

 UDP-glucuronate + D-Man-alpha-(1->3)-D-Glc-beta-(1->4)-D-Glc-alpha-1-diphospho-ditrans,octacis-undecaprenol  UDP + D-GlcA-beta-(1->2)-D-Man-alpha-(1->3)-D-Glc-beta-(1->4)-D-Glc-alpha-1-diphospho-ditrans,octacis-undecaprenol

The enzyme is involved in the biosynthesis of the exopolysaccharides xanthan (in the bacterium Xanthomonas campestris) and acetan (in the bacterium Gluconacetobacter xylinus).

References

External links 

EC 2.4.1